Reticulosa is an extinct order of sea sponges in the class Hexactinellida.

References

Hexactinellida